The Arabian Canal is a planned 75 km man-made canal in Dubai. The canal construction plan is currently on hold.  The canal would begin at the Dubai Marina, where some excavation was begun, and will go round the Al Maktoum International Airport before entering the sea again at the outer end of Palm Jebel Ali.  Dubai Waterfront would form the first phase of the larger Arabian Canal.  The canal is being developed by the company Limitless.

Project overview

The canal, originally planned to be completed in 2012, has been on hold since 2009.  If completed, it would require the excavation of 1.1 billion cubic meters of soil.  The canal itself was projected to cost $11 billion, and would snake from Dubai Waterfront in Jebel Ali and pass to the east of the Dubai World Central development before turning back towards the Palm Jumeirah.  Plans also called for $50 billion to be spent constructing a new "city" within the city, which would take 20,000 hectares of land in the south bank of the channel.  The Arabian canal would be 150 metres wide and six metres deep, enough to accommodate yachts up to 40 metres long.

The canal was designed to be fully navigable, with locks on each end for tidal control. Water is to flow through the canal to prevent stagnation.

Engineers

Calthorpe Associates, an urban design firm in California, designed and was overseeing the canal plan.  Calthorpe collaborated with the landscape architecture firm SWA Group, and the engineering firms Moffatt & Nichol, Parsons International, and Mott MacDonald.

See also
 List of development projects in Dubai

References

External links
 Official website
 Propdubai.com

Buildings and structures under construction in Dubai
Waterfronts
Canals in the United Arab Emirates